The Air Mail Act of 1925, also known as the Kelly Act, was a key piece of legislation that intended to free the airmail from total control by the Post Office Department. In short, it allowed the Postmaster General to contract private companies to carry mail. The Act was sponsored by Clyde Kelly, and became legislation in February that year.

The act created a bidding period for small airmail routes, setting rates and subsidies contractors would receive for flying mail. The first contracts were awarded to Colonial Air Transport, National Air Transport, Robertson Aircraft Corporation, Western Air Express and Varney Air Lines. Contractors were paid $3.00 per pound of mail for the first 1,000 miles traveled. Due to the surplus aircraft available after the First World War, particularly de Havilland DH-4s, the act bolstered a nascent aviation industry in the United States.

By 1927, over 2.5 million miles were traveled by US Airmail Service planes, carrying over 22 million letters. Further regulation ensued quite rapidly, such as those issued by second assistant postmaster general Col. Paul Henderson, which required pilots and their aircraft to receive a certificate of airworthiness from the Post Office, and that each company needed to post at least ten thousand dollars in good faith bonds.

Associated United States Federal Statutes
United States legislation authorizing aerial navigation and contract services for the transportation of United States air mail.

See also

Air Mail scandal
Aviation Service Act
Aviation Act of 1917

References

External links
 
 * 
 

Postal system of the United States
Airmail
United States federal postal legislation
1925 in American law